The Gaikindo Indonesia International Auto Show (GIIAS)  is the largest auto show in Indonesia. It was started in 1986 as the Gaikindo Car Exhibition, then continued as Indonesia International Motor Show. Since 2015, the GIIAS was spun off from the Indonesia International Motor Show and is held annually at Indonesia Convention Exhibition in Tangerang Regency, and also as series in Surabaya, Medan, Semarang and Makassar.

History

Established in 1986, the Gaikindo Car Exhibition, hosted by Gaikindo was Indonesia’s largest automotive exhibition. In 2006, the exhibition reached a new platform by becoming an international-scale exhibition endorsed by Organisation Internationale des Constructeurs d'Automobiles (OICA) and changed its name to Indonesia International Motor Show.

Early history
In 1986, the first automotive exhibition was hosted by Gaikindo under the name of Gaikindo Car Exhibition, and 13 Gaikindo members took part. In 1989, the exhibition changed its name to Jakarta Auto Expo. In 1994, after being postponed for two years due to the government’s tight money policy, Jakarta Auto Expo was back and in 1996, the exhibition reached a record-breaking achievement compared to the previous years, attended by more than 200,000 visitors.

2000–2005 
In 2000, Jakarta Auto Expo changed its name to Gaikindo Auto Expo after being postponed for 3 years in a row due to Asian Financial Crisis. In 2003, the 12th Gaikindo Auto Expo held from 19 to 27 July 2003, participated by 150 automotive-related companies, and covered 35,000 sqm of Jakarta Convention Center (JCC), and visited by 180.000 visitors.

2006–2014 
In 2006, the exhibition was listed as part of the world’s automotive exhibition, endorsed by OICA (Organisation Internationale des Constructeurs d’Automobiles) and the exhibition changed its name to Indonesia International Motor Show. In 2008, the exhibition covered 40.000sqm of JCC, indoor and outdoor, participated by 161 exhibitors and visited by 206.100 visitors.

In attempt to remain progressive, in 2009, the exhibition moved to a bigger venue: Jakarta International Expo Kemayoran, Pademangan, North Jakarta, which covered area around 60,000 sqm, participated by 163 exhibitors and visited by 241.687 visitors. Furthermore, after a remarkable success on the previous year, in 2014, the exhibition was utilising more than 80,000 sqm, participated by 322 exhibitors and visited by 380.365 visitors, the exhibition was in urgent need of more extensive area.

GIIAS through the years

2015 
The 23rd Gaikindo Indonesia International Auto Show was held from 20 to 30 August 2015. Unlike the Indonesia International Motor Show, the Gaikindo Indonesia International Auto Show (GIIAS) is organized by Seven Events and held at Indonesia Convention Exhibition. The 2015 show debuts the Honda BR-V prototype (world premiere), facelifted first generation Suzuki Ertiga, third generation Toyota Alphard Hybrid and eighth generation Toyota Hilux.

2016 
The 24th Gaikindo Indonesia International Auto Show was held from 11 to 21 August 2016. The 2016 show debuts the Daihatsu Sigra and Toyota Calya, third generation Kia Grand Sedona, fourth generation Kia Sportage and second generation Suzuki SX4 S-Cross.

2017 

The 25th Gaikindo Indonesia International Auto Show was held from 10 to 20 August 2017. The 2017 show debuts the facelifted third generation Audi A3 Sportback, second generation Audi Q5, fifth generation Honda Civic Type R, second generation Mazda CX-5, second generation Mazda CX-9, Mitsubishi Xpander (world premiere), fourth generation Suzuki Baleno hatchback, facelifted third generation Toyota Voxy and second generation Volkswagen Tiguan. The 2017 show was visited by around 450,000 visitors.

2018 
The 26th Gaikindo Indonesia International Auto Show was held from 2 to 12 August 2018. The 2018 show debuts the fourth generation Audi A8 L, second generation Audi RS5 Coupé, BMW i8 Roadster, second generation Honda Brio (world premiere), facelifted second generation Honda HR-V, fourth generation Hyundai Santa Fe, Lexus UX, facelifted third generation Mazda6 and Nissan Terra.

2019 
The 27th Gaikindo Indonesia International Auto Show was held from 18 to 28 July 2019. The 2019 show debuts the Audi Q8, seventh generation BMW 3 Series (G20), tenth generation Honda Accord, fourth generation Mazda3, Mitsubishi Eclipse Cross, facelifted Mitsubishi Outlander PHEV, facelifted fifth generation Mitsubishi Triton, facelifted third generation Nissan X-Trail, fourth generation Suzuki Jimny, sixth generation Toyota HiAce, fifth generation Toyota Supra and second generation Volkswagen Tiguan Allspace.

2020 
The 28th Gaikindo Indonesia International Auto Show was planned to be held from 7 to 17 August 2020, but it was pushed back to 22 October to 1 November 2020 due to the COVID-19 pandemic. On 18 August 2020, the organizers announced that the 2020 event would be eventually cancelled due to time constraints caused by large-scale social restrictions that halts the plans of the show.

2021 
The 28th Gaikindo Indonesia International Auto Show was planned to be held from 12 to 22 August 2021, but it was pushed back to 9 to 19 September 2021, and later, 11 to 21 November 2021 due to Indonesia's Community Activities Restrictions Enforcement during the COVID-19 pandemic. The 2021 show debuts the third-generation Daihatsu Xenia, third-generation Toyota Avanza and Toyota Veloz (world premieres), Honda SUV RS Concept (world premiere), second-generation Hyundai Creta, third-generation Isuzu D-Max, second-generation Isuzu MU-X, fourth-generation Kia Grand Carnival, facelifted Mitsubishi Xpander, MG 5 GT, and MG 5 EV.

2022 
The 29th Gaikindo Indonesia International Auto Show was held from 11 to 21 August 2022. The 2022 show debuts the facelifted second-generation Audi Q7, BMW 2 Series (G42), BMW i4, BMW iX, Hyundai Stargazer, Kia EV6, Kia Niro, fourth-generation Kia Sorento, fifth-generation Lexus RX, facelifted Mitsubishi Xpander Cross, facelifted Nissan Terra, second-generation Subaru BRZ, facelifted second-generation Subaru XV, fifth-generation Suzuki Baleno hatchback, Suzuki S-Presso, Toyota bZ4X, Toyota GR86, and Toyota Hilux GR Sport.

Gaikindo Jakarta Auto Week 
A smaller spin-off of the show, Gaikindo Jakarta Auto Week, was announced at the same time of the cancellation of the 2020 event. The event is held at Jakarta Convention Center in Senayan.

2022 Gaikindo Jakarta Auto Week 
Originally, the 1st Gaikindo Jakarta Auto Week was planned to be held from 21 to 29 November 2020 as a replacement event for GIIAS 2020, despite to coronavirus concerns, but was eventually moved to 9 to 17 January 2021, 6 to 14 March 2021, 11 to 19 December 2021, 5 to 13 March 2022, and later, 12 to 20 March 2022. The show debuts the fourth-generation Kia Carens, fifth-generation Kia Sportage, and second-generation Lexus NX.

2023 Gaikindo Jakarta Auto Week 
The 2nd Gaikindo Jakarta Auto Week was held from 10 to 19 March 2023. The show debuts the second-generation Daihatsu Ayla and Toyota Agya, Lexus RZ, third-generation Subaru Crosstrek, and fifth-generation Toyota RAV4 PHEV GR Sport.

References 

Auto shows
Auto shows in Indonesia
Annual events in Indonesia